The Marcan Tiger Preserve is located in the panhandle of Florida, and covers . It was created by Dr. Josip Marcan, an expert on tigers. The preserve is mainly dedicated to the critically endangered Bengal tiger.

External links
 Official web site

Protected areas of Holmes County, Florida
Nature reserves in Florida